Jade de Melo (born 9 February 1993) is an Australian rules footballer playing for the  in the AFL Women's (AFLW). After being overlooked in the national draft days earlier, de Melo was eventually drafted by Fremantle with their second selection and the 10th overall pick in the 2017 AFL Women's rookie draft. She was delisted by Fremantle at the end of the 2018 season.

De Melo played in 's 2022 SANFLW premiership win, kicking three goals in the Grand Final.

On 31 May 2022, De Melo signed with AFLW expansion club

References

External links 

1993 births
Living people
Fremantle Football Club (AFLW) players
Australian rules footballers from Western Australia
Port Adelaide Football Club (AFLW) players